The A 20 road is an A-Grade trunk road in Sri Lanka. It connects Anuradhapura with Rambewa.

References

Highways in Sri Lanka